The members of the 24th Knesset were elected on 23 March 2021.

The 24th Knesset dissolved itself on 30 June 2022 triggering snap elections held on 1 November 2022.

Members of the Knesset

Replacements

See also
Thirty-sixth government of Israel
Party lists for the 2021 Israeli legislative election

Notes

References

External links

 
24